Captain Kenneth Albert Elloway (17 January 1916 – 22 September 1980) was a British teacher, trombonist, double-bassist, cornetist, and conductor of many orchestras.

External links
 Kenneth Elloway at The Canadian Encyclopedia

Canadian conductors (music)
Male conductors (music)
1916 births
1980 deaths
British male conductors (music)
British music educators
British classical trombonists
Male trombonists
British classical double-bassists
Male double-bassists
Cornetists
Academic staff of the Dalhousie University
Alumni of the Royal Military School of Music
20th-century classical trombonists
20th-century British conductors (music)
20th-century double-bassists
20th-century Canadian male musicians
Canadian military musicians
British emigrants to Canada